Mixomyrophis is a genus of eel in the family Ophichthidae. It is known only from the Atlantic Ocean and Red Sea in the vicinity of Anguilla and Israel.

Species
There are currently 2 recognized species in this genus:
 Mixomyrophis longidorsalis Hibino, Kimura & Golani, 2014 (Red Sea worm eel) 
 Mixomyrophis pusillipinna J. E. McCosker, 1985

References

Ophichthidae